is a Japanese actress, voice actress, tarento, and gravure idol from Hokkaido. She portrayed Mere in the Super Sentai Series Juken Sentai Gekiranger. She has also appeared in Food Fight, an episode of Carlos, and several idol videos.

In 2010, she appeared in the live-action film, Wonderful World, with voice actors, Mamoru Miyano, Tomokazu Sugita, Tomokazu Seki, Showtaro Morikubo and Daisuke Namikawa.

Filmography

Movies
Juken Sentai Gekiranger: Nei-Nei! Hou-Hou! Hong Kong Decisive Battle - Mere (2007)
Juuken Sentai Gekiranger vs. Boukenger - Mere (2008)
Engine Sentai Go-onger vs. Gekiranger - Mere (2009)
Kamen Rider Ghost: The 100 Eyecons and Ghost's Fated Moment - Himiko (2016)
Uchu Sentai Kyuranger vs. Space Squad - Mere (2018)

Television dramas 
Rokubanme no Sayoko - Tōko Hirabayashi (2000)
Juken Sentai Gekiranger - Mere (2007)
Kamen Rider W - Kyoko Todoroki (2010)
Unofficial Sentai Akibaranger - Nurse Hirata (2013)

Television animation 
Shikabane Hime: Aka - Ruo Minai (2008)
Cross Game - Risa Shido (2009)
Hajime No Ippo: New Challenger - Kumi Mashiba (2009)
Sengoku Otome: Momoiro Paradox - Masamune Date (2011)
Yu-Gi-Oh! Arc-V - Melissa Claire (2015)

Original video animation (OVA) 
Nozoki Ana - Makiko Terakado (2013)

Japanese dub

Live-action
The Gentlemen - Rosalind Pearson (Michelle Dockery)
Legends of Tomorrow - Zari Tomaz (Tala Ashe)
Sunflower (2022 TV Osaka edition) - Masha (Ludmila Savelyeva)

Animation
Trolls World Tour - Satin and Chenille

Radio

Radio drama
Nissan A, Abe Reiji: Beyond the Average - Satsuki Himekawa (2009–)
River Side Cafe - Saki Nonomiya (2013–14)

Presenter
Music Line (2014–15)

References

External links
 

1983 births
Living people
Across Entertainment voice actors
Japanese film actresses
Japanese gravure models
Japanese television actresses
Japanese television personalities
Japanese voice actresses
Voice actresses from Hokkaido
Voice actresses from Sapporo